The White Sands pupfish (Cyprinodon tularosa) is a species of pupfish in the family Cyprinodontidae. It is endemic to the Tularosa Basin in southern New Mexico, in the Western United States. They are only found in two springs and two small streams in southwest New Mexico. White Sands pupfish have dark eyes and silver scales. Adult males have a slight blue color.

See also
  — North American pupfish genus
 Pupfish

References

Cyprinodon
Tularosa Basin
Pupfish, White Sands
Pupfish, White Sands
Endemic fauna of New Mexico
Endangered fauna of the United States
Taxa named by Robert Rush Miller
Taxa named by Anthony A. Echelle
Fish described in 1975
Taxonomy articles created by Polbot